Francesca Lluch Armengol i Socias, known as Francina Armengol (born 11 August 1971), is a Spanish politician from the Socialist Party of the Balearic Islands. She has been the President of the Balearic Islands since 2015, and also the first woman to ever hold the office.

She tested positive for COVID-19 on 20 December 2021.

References 

|-

1971 births
Living people
Presidents of the Balearic Islands
Members of the Parliament of the Balearic Islands
University of Barcelona alumni
People from Inca, Mallorca
21st-century Spanish women politicians